The Columbus mayoral election of 1963 was the 72nd mayoral election in Columbus, Ohio.  It was held on Tuesday, November 5, 1963.  Incumbent Republican mayor Ralston Westlake was defeated by Democratic party nominee and former mayor Jack Sensenbrenner.

Further reading

1963 Ohio elections
Mayoral elections in Columbus, Ohio
Columbus